The College of Education is the undergraduate and graduate education school of the University of Illinois Urbana-Champaign. It was founded in 1905 and took on its current name in 1918 after previously being known as the School of Education. The college offers undergraduate, graduate, and online programs in areas including elementary education, early childhood education, special education, and Educational Organization and Leadership. It began with six departments; three of them merged and formed the largest department in the college. All departments offer masters and doctoral degrees. However, only two departments offer undergraduate degree programs: Special Education and Curriculum & Instruction. The college also offers 16 online programs. Students seeking an undergraduate degree in the college must meet the minimum graduation requirement set forth by the university. To obtain a certification, students must also meet the requirements of the Council on Teacher Education, a professional educational administration at the University of Illinois. The total enrollment is 1,361 students as of 2015.

Campus

The main building of the College of Education is the Education building, which is located on the south quadrangle of the campus, near the Krannert Art Museum. The Education Building was built in 1964 and designed by the university architectural professor A. Richard Williams.

The college planned to expand their building to accommodate for the number of growing students. A building model was made representing what would be the new college building. However, the date for this expansion has yet to be confirmed by the college.

Departments
The College of Education began with six departments.

 Curriculum and Instruction
 Special Education
 Educational Psychology
 Human Resource Education
 Education Policy Studies
 Educational Organization and Leadership

The departments of Education Policy Studies, Human Resource Education, and Educational Organization and Leadership merged and became what is known as now the Department of Education Policy, Organization and Leadership.

Curriculum and Instruction
The Department of Curriculum and Instruction prepares students on the issues of teaching, learning, and child development. This department is ranked #5 in the nation, according to U.S. News & World Report.

Special education
The Department of Special Education focuses on the education of students with intellectual and learning disabilities from birth to age 21.

Educational Psychology
The Department of Educational Psychology offers graduate program in the study of how students learn in different educational environments.

Department of Education Policy, Organization and Leadership
The Department of Education Policy, Organization and Leadership offers study mainly on the rules and regulations that governs the proceeding of a learning environment. There are also nine online programs available for on-campus or international students. The department is one of the largest in the college, with over 380 graduate students on campus and 1,800 students enrolled in the on-line programs.

Academic programs

Undergraduate programs
The college offers five undergraduate majors in Learning and Behavior Specialist, Learning and Education Studies, Middle Grades Education, Early Childhood Education, and Elementary Education.

Graduate programs
All six of the college departments offer master's and doctoral degrees to graduate students. Funding for graduate students is limited.

Online programs
The college offers twelve online programs. Students can obtain online master's degree in programs including:

Community College Teaching and Learning
Human Resource Development
Curriculum Technology and Education Reform (CTER)
Global Studies in Education

Office of International Programs

Greater China Initiative

The Greater China Initiative was established in the 2012-2013 academic year to enable a staff member of the college to based in Shanghai, China to "advance both the global influence and the international impact of the College of Education by promoting faculty expertise, undergraduate and graduate degree programs, non-degree certificate programs, contract projects, and alumni events [in the region]." The initiative is partially supported by the Yew Chung Education Foundation which has allowed a Teach in China study abroad cohort composed of undergraduate and graduate students to teach for three to six weeks at Yew Wah School of Shanghai which is located in the Changning District of Shanghai.

Requirements

Admissions

Freshmen who applied to the college are all admitted to the Pre-Early Childhood, Pre-Elementary Education, Pre-Special Education curriculum. Elementary education and early childhood education (academic programs in the Department of curriculum and instruction) requires Junior standing with at least 60 hours of coursework. The special education program requires student to have at least 30 hours by the end of freshmen year.

Graduation

Undergraduate students must satisfy the University graduation requirement as well as the requirement set forth by the Council on Teacher Education.  Student teaching is also required and must be completed at the University of Illinois at Urbana-Champaign. Depending on the curriculum chosen, students must complete a minimum of 125 to 129 credit hours to graduate. Upon completion of these requirements, students will receive certification to teach. Each certification varies depending on the programs of study.

Research

The college has a wide range of research topics from Early Childhood Development to Management & Leadership. It also has the following nationwide research centers and outreach units:

Office of Community College Research and Leadership
Early Childhood and Parenting Collaborative
Illinois New Teacher Collaborative
Office of Mathematics, Science and Technology Education (MSTE)
National Center for Engineering and Technology Education (NCETE)
University Primary School

Events

The College of Education hosts the annual Van Miller Distinguished Scholar Practitioner Award in Springfield. This award is given to those who have presented excellence in the field of education in the states of Illinois. The selection of the recipients is made by college administration alumni and professors.

See also 
 National Council for Accreditation of Teacher Education

References

External links
 

Education
Education
Schools of education in Illinois
1905 establishments in Illinois